This is a list LGBT rights organisations in Belize.

Table

United Belize Advocacy Movement 

The United Belize Advocacy Movement, also known as UNIBAM or UniBAM, are a Belize-based non-governmental organisation that advocate against the discrimination and stigmatisation of the LGBT community in Belize.

History 
UNIBAM trace their origins to a 2005 multi-centre study of men who have sex with men, lead by Paul Edwards of the Ministry of Health, and Chad Martin of the US Centers for Disease Control and Prevention. The study prompted discussions, primarily in Orange Walk Town, which lead to the founding of UNIBAM's predecessor organisation, UNIDAD 96, by Alex Avalos, Fernando Novelo, Caleb Orozco, William Smith, and Jerry Mendoza, 'along with many other nameless colleagues.' On 16 February 2006, in space provided by Arnulfo Kantun of the National Development Foundation in Belize City, UNIBAM was established by Caleb Orozco and '10 other persons from Belize City and Orange Walk.' UNIBAM were registered as a non-governmental organisation on 4 May 2006, and secured their first grant in October of that year from the Tides Foundation.

Notably, UNIBAM successfully challenged the long-standing statutory criminalisation of homosexuality in Belize in the 2010–2016 Orozco v Attorney General case.

Activities 
UNIBAM aim 'to reduce stigma and discrimination [against members of the LGBT community in Belize].' Their primary activities include research and advocacy, including formal representation of the Belizean LGBT community before national and international bodies, and informal representation via national media. As of 2008, the primary bodies liaised with included the UN Human Rights Council, UN Human Rights Committee, the Organisation of American States, the Caribbean Forum for Lesbians, All-sexuals and Gays, the Belize Alliance Against AIDS, and the Belize Family Life Association.

Promoting Empowerment Through Awareness of Lesbian and Bisexual Women 

Promoting Empowerment Through Awareness of Lesbian and Bisexual Women, more commonly known as PETAL, are a Belize-based non-governmental organisation that advocate for and provide support services to LGBT women in Belize.

History 
PETAL were established in 2011 by Marla Simone Hill, then Vice President of the United Belize Advocacy Movement, who had observed 'that very little advocacy was being done for the women in the LGBT community [of Belize].' The following year, the organisation engaged the support of social activist Abigail McKay, and began Conversations, their hallmark programme, deemed 'a critical component of PETAL's work.' In 2015, they secured a six-month grant from the United Belize Advocacy Movement, and registered as a not-for-profit non-governmental organisation on 29 December 2015, with a pro tempore board consisting of Simone Hill, Ifáṣínà Efunyemi, Charrice Talbert, and Abigail McKay. Their inaugural general meeting was held in December 2018, with an active membership of 'over 60 women.'

Activities 
PETAL aim 'to achieve social, economic and gender justice for all women in Belize[,] especially [lesbian and bisexual] women[,] through advocacy and empowerment.' Their 'signature' programme is Consversations, 'a safe and brave space in which women sit together in a circle to learn, share, listen and support each other,' held since 2012. Other notable programmes include an annual conference during International Women's Day, a Valentine's Day gala, family programming during Mother's Day, monthly gender-based violence outreach, and various sensitisation and awareness workshops. By 2019, PETAL had an active membership of 75 women across the country, and were serving 'more than 100 women and girls.'

Belize Youth Empowerment for Change 

The Belize Youth Empowerment for Change, also known by their acronym BYEC, are a Belize-based non-governmental organisation that advocate for LGBT individuals, particularly young ones, in Belize.

History 
BYEC were registered as a non-governmental organisation in 2013, by fellows and alumni of the Youth Leadership in Sexual and Reproductive Health and the Environment Programme of GOBelize. They spearheaded the annual celebration of LGBT pride in Belmopan, Cayo, in 2015.

Activities 
BYEC are a youth-led organisation which aim 'to represent the voices and dreams of young Belizeans with a focus on LGBT youth and [their] empowerment.' They have, in coalition with other LGBT rights organisations in Belize, sought 'to remove the stigma around Belize's LGBT community by holding open forums and debates.' By 2017, their coalition had provided HIV testing to 19,000 men, and held six workshops with '100 government officials [and] 25 members of BYEC' regarding LGBT and human rights, reproductive health, and human sexuality. By the following year, BYEC-led workshops in Belmopan and various villages had engaged over 490 youth.

Our Circle 

Our Circle are a Belize-based non-governmental organisation that advocate for and provide support services to LGBT families and individuals in Belize.

History 
Our Circle were established in October 2013 and registered as a non-governmental organisation in February 2017. They were founded by Derricia Castillo-Salazar 'with two other friends [who] felt upset because the LGBTI community was being portrayed [in Belize] as an underground orgy community that engaged in heavy drinking and reckless behaviour.' Their early activities included social events and trips aimed at fostering a cohesive LGBT community and eroding the aforementioned stereotype.

Notably, Our Circle served as co-chairs of the International Family Equality Day Network from 2015March2018, commemorated the first International Family Equality Day in Belize in May 2017, opened a physical community resource centre in August 2017, and successfully advocated for the inclusion of LGBT-inclusive language in the national census in December 2019. The last milestone, in particular, has been deemed 'powerful,' as it marked 'the first time in Belizean history that LBTQ+ individuals [would] be accounted for officially [ie in official statistics].'

Activities 
Our Circle aim 'to advance legal and lived equality for diverse [LGBT] families, and for those who wish to form them, through building community, changing hearts and minds, and driving policy change [in Belize].' They have provided meeting and informal social space to the local LGBT community at their offices or Community Centre since the latter's inauguration in August 2017. The Centre is thought to be 'the only established safe space for the LGBT community and their families in the entire country of Belize.' By 2017, Our Circle's work had 'engaged approximately 200 members of the Belizean LGBT community.' By 2020, their Centre had provided a safe space or support services to 'hundreds of people,' while the organisation as a whole had expended more than $980,000 BZD ($490,000 USD) in providing support services, raising awareness, and advocating for the LGBT community.

Trans In Action Belize 

Trans In Action Belize, also known as TIA Belize, are a Belize-based non-governmental organisation that advocate for LGBT individuals, particularly transgender, transsexual, transvestite ones, in Belize.

History 
TIA Belize were established and registered as a non-governmental organisation in 2014 by Zahnia Canul and Mia Quetzal. They joined the regional Network of Trans People in Latin America and the Caribbean, also known as RED LACTRANS, in 2016, and helped to establish the Network's Centre for the Documentation of the Trans Situation in Latin America and the Caribbean, also known as CEDOSTALC.

Activities 
TIA Belize, described in 2019 as 'the first and only NGO by and for transgender persons living in Belize,' are constituted as a group of transgender persons in Belize who seek to 'promote respect for their human rights and dignity as transgender persons.' Towards this end, they have served as liaison for various national and overseas organisations undertaking trans-related work in the country, including USAID, the UN Development Fund, the National AIDS Commission, UNIBAM, and RED LACTRANS.

Empower Yourself Belize Movement 

The Empower Yourself Belize Movement, also known by their acronym EYBM, are a Belize-based non-governmental organisation that advocate for LGBT individuals, particularly young and HIV/AIDS-positive ones, in Belize. Their primary activities include HIV/AIDS clinics, public awareness marches, and workshops on HIV/AIDS and LGBT and human rights. Notably, on 20 August 2016, the organisation facilitated the first public celebration of LGBT pride in Belize, in collaboration with the Belize Family Life Association.

Belize Trans Colours 

Belize Trans Colours, also known by their acronym BTC, are a Belize-based non-governmental organisation that advocate for LGBT individuals, particularly transgender ones, in Belize. They were registered as a non-governmental organisation in October 2018, and are engaged in in-person outreach to transgender men and women, especially those involved in sex work in San Pedro, Ambergris Caye.

See also 
 LGBT rights in Belize
 Women's rights in Belize

Notes and references

Explanatory footnotes

Short citations

Full citations 

 
 
 
 
 
 
 
 
 
 
 
 
 
 
 
 
 
 
 
 
 
 
 
 
 
 
 
 
 

LGBT political advocacy groups in Belize
Organisations based in Belize
LGBT rights in Belize